{{DISPLAYTITLE:C25H43N13O10}}
The molecular formula C25H43N13O10 (molar mass: 685.69 g/mol, exact mass: 685.3256 u) may refer to:

 Enviomycin
 Viomycin

Molecular formulas